U.S. Naval Forces Korea is a major shore command of the United States Navy that serves as the shore support agency for all U.S. Naval activity in South Korea.  Known by the initials "CNFK", an abbreviation of the address format of the unit ("Commander, U.S. Naval Forces Korea"), its headquarters are at Busan Naval Base, Busan.

CNFK is jointly under the command of the operational command of United States Seventh Fleet, responsible for the support of all U.S. naval forces on the Korean peninsula, and United States Forces Korea. CNFK is also CNIC's assigned Region Commander with administrative control over what is currently the only naval installation in South Korea, which is Fleet Activity Chinhae. CNFK is commanded by a rear admiral (lower half) who serves as the Navy liaison to the Commander of the United States Forces Korea. In times of war, CNFK becomes a ground-based task force of United States Seventh Fleet.

History 
U.S. Naval Forces, Korea, was established on 1 July 1957, with headquarters in Seoul. The command was created by the reorganization of the Naval Forces, Far East Command into the separate commands of Naval Forces Japan and Naval Forces Korea. Commander, Naval Forces Korea, assumed the following additional duties:

 Commander, Naval Component Command, United Nations Command 
 Chief, U.S. Naval Advisory Group, Korea, and Navy Advisor to the Republic of Korea 
 Commander, Naval Component Command, U.S. Forces Korea 
 On-Call Member, United Nations Military Armistice Commission

The principal mission of CNFK was acting as part of the United Nations Command. In this regard, the commander exercised command of U.S. Naval Forces assigned or attached, and operational control over the Republic of Korea Navy.

Rear Admiral Mark A. Schafer assumed command of CNFK in September 2021.

List of commanders

References

External links

 CNFK official website
 CNFK on Navy.mil
 U.S. 7th Fleet
 United States Forces Korea
 

United States military in South Korea
Commands of the United States Navy
Commander, Naval Forces K